Lego Star Wars: The Quest for R2-D2 is a 2009 comedy short film directed by director Peder Pedersen and produced by M2Film for Lego and Cartoon Network in collaboration with Lucasfilm.

It was made as a follow-up to Lego Indiana Jones and the Raiders of the Lost Brick (2008) and premiered on Cartoon Network on August 27, 2009, "in celebration of 10 years of LEGO Star Wars". The story follows the characters from the 2008 series, Star Wars: The Clone Wars. Similar to Lego Indiana Jones and the Raiders of the Lost Brick the film also includes several inside-jokes that pay homage to the Star Wars series, the Indiana Jones films and George Lucas's THX 1138.

Plot
The movie begins with Anakin Skywalker and R2-D2 on a droid control ship where they have completed an important mission and attempt to escape in Anakin's Jedi Starfighter. They are then attacked by Hyena droid bombers and R2-D2 is blasted out into space.  When Anakin he returns to the Jedi Temple on Coruscant, the Jedi masters scold him and tell him to find the droid along with his special blueprints. Separatist leaders are desperate to recover the droid, and Chancellor Palpatine has dispatched a special squad of clones to Hoth to do the same.

In Tatooine, R2-D2 uses an umbrella.

Meanwhile, Anakin, in his Y-Wing fighter, and Ahsoka Tano, in her Jedi Starfighter, begin their search through an asteroid field, where they encounter an Exogorth.  When it tries to eat Anakin, but the Jedi pilots his fighter so that the Exogorth gets an asteroid stuck in his mouth.  Then Ahsoka blasts the giant rock and they escape while the slug is too occupied with coughing.

Back at the oasis on Tatooine, three Jawas find R2-D2, jam his sensors and carry him back to their sandcrawler. The clones the chancellor sent out have begun their search on the ice planet Hoth.  While their troops have fun at the camp building snowmen looks like Darth Vader's helmet, building igloos and having snowball fights, Captain Rex and Commander Cody use a droid scanner to find a hundred Battle Droids with a Spider Droid, a Corporate Alliance Tank Droid, and an AT-AT walker. They slide along the ice as Cody takes the light off of the scanner and Rex uses his blaster as a hockey stick.

Returning to Tatooine, the Jawas are having a garage sale and are busy negotiating with Ewoks. Indiana Jones is seen as a cameo, rummaging in a box containing the head of C-3PO and Darth Vader's breathing mask. They are also selling Han Solo in a carbonite block, a Rancor, and R2-D2 hooked up to a vacuum cleaner hose. R2-D2 is bought by General Grievous and two battle droids and taken to a Trade Federation battlecruiser with the Death Star holding a "Super Secret Bad Guy Base" sign.  Grievous leads the droid down the hall, but R2-D2 is able to escape and send a message for help, before hiding in a supply closet.

Out in space, Anakin and Ahsoka are aboard the Twilight flanked by the clones' attack shuttle, a V-19 Torrent starfighter, and an ARC-170 starfighter when they receive R2-D2's message. Meanwhile, back in the supply closet, R2-D2 has met a pink feminine astromech droid named R2-KT and apparently become attracted to her.

Outside the base, the Republic has come out of hyperspace and an epic battle is taking place. The Twilight lands in a hangar and the two Jedi hurry towards their little blue friend. Anakin is momentarily distracted when he sees a TIE Advanced starfighter. He admires it, with Darth Vader's shadow cast against the wall until they are attacked by battle droids.  They fight through the droids and continue.

Grievous has taken R2-D2 to a room where Darth Tyranus and Asajj Ventress are standing by a machine designed to dissect the droid to get his plans. Anakin and Ahsoka arrive in time to save R2-D2 and are then joined by Captain Rex and Commander Cody.  The three villains then draw their lightsabers and prepare for a fight. Obi-Wan Kenobi and Yoda then appear. Yoda uses the Force to take apart the platform Dooku, Ventress, and Grievous stand on, dropping them as they fall into space, and reassemble the platform into the Tantive IV, which they use to escape the exploding base.

Safely past the danger and with R2-D2 recovered, the droid projects a holographic image of the Malevolence. He then projects a sign that talks about the grand opening of a new Star Wars themed amusement park, Skywalker World.

The group all go to Skywalker World and play games, including Bumper Landspeeders, Wak-A-Wok, C-3PO's souvenir shop selling Lego sets, the Jedi Force O Meter and Leias cotton candy.  R2-D2 is on a tunnel of love boat ride with his droid girlfriend R2-KT, and as they ride into a building shaped like Darth Vader's helmet, he ends the movie by screaming out his infamous astromech squeal.

Voice cast
 Matt Lanter as Anakin Skywalker (grunts)
 James Arnold Taylor as Obi-Wan Kenobi (grunts)
 Dee Bradley Baker as Captain Rex, Commander Cody, Clone Troopers (archived audio)
 Frank Welker as the Exogorth
 Matthew Wood as General Grievous and Battle Droids (grunts and archived audio)
 Christopher Lee as Darth Tyranus (also known as Count Dooku) (grunts)
 Tom Kane as Yoda (grunts)

Video game
In October 2009, Lego announced a free online video game tie in to The Quest for R2-D2 created using the Unity engine.  The version on Lego.com features four playable characters (two to start, two unlockable) and the ability to save the player's progress. Each character the player wins with gets them another quarter of instructions for a Lego Trade Federation Cruiser. The version on starwars.com allows only the use of Anakin Skywalker and does not have a save feature. The game version on the Lego website also allows the use of Asajj Ventress. The player has a choice to fight for the dark side or the light side of the force (between Anakin or Asajj).

The game was well received, with Jim Squires of GameZebo calling it "even better than the originals".

References

External links
 

2009 television films
2009 films
Star Wars: Quest for R2-D2
Quest for R2-D2
Quest for R2-D2
Lucasfilm animated films
2009 short films
2009 science fiction action films
2000s science fiction comedy films
2009 computer-animated films
2000s action comedy films
2000s English-language films
2000s American films